Mārtiņš Podžus (born 29 June 1994) is a Latvian tennis player.

Podžus has a career high ATP singles ranking of 418 achieved on 17 February 2020. He also has a career high ATP doubles ranking of 390 achieved on 19 August 2019.

Podžus has represented Latvia at the Davis Cup where he has a W/L record of 19–16. He debuted in the Latvian Davis Cup team at 17 years and 10 days old, in 8 July 2011, against Denmark.

Podžus has a twin brother Jānis Podžus who is also a tennis player.

Future and Challenger finals

Singles: 14 (7–7)

Doubles 15 (8–7)

Davis Cup

Participations: (19–16)

   indicates the outcome of the Davis Cup match followed by the score, date, place of event, the zonal classification and its phase, and the court surface.

* Walkover doesn't count in his overall record.

References

External links
 
 
 

1994 births
Living people
Latvian male tennis players
People from Bauska
Sportspeople from Riga